The Senator was a popular 1890 comedic play by David D. Lloyd and Sydney Rosenfeld, also made into a 1915 silent film.

Play
Rosenfeld, a prolific writer and adapter of plays, completed the play after Lloyd died; it is not known for sure how much Rosenfeld did to revise the text.  He himself claimed to have made major revisions (though acknowledging the unfairness of claiming such when Lloyd could not dispute it), while some critics suggested he just made minor alterations, perhaps supposing that Rosenfeld himself was not capable of producing such fine product.   After initial performances outside New York (it was first performed in St. Louis) it debuted at the Star Theatre on Broadway on January 13, 1890, and ran for 119 performances.

The play starred actor William H. Crane and Georgie Drew Barrymore.   After it closed on Broadway, Crane continued to perform the play for the next three seasons, and it was considered one of the highlight roles of his career, as well as Barrymore's.

The plot is based on a true story of a claim for damages from the War of 1812 for the sinking of the brig General Armstrong which was not resolved for 70 years.

The title character of Senator Hannibal Rivers was modeled on Senator Preston B. Plumb of Kansas.  When Plumb saw the play he was surprised to see Crane wearing a stovepipe hat, commenting to Crane that "I never wore a silk hat in my life, and my creditors wouldn't know me for myself in a head piece like that."  Crane threw the hat down and declared he wouldn't wear it again, though he continued to do so, at least in New York.  According to a biography of Plumb, before one performance of the play in Washington, D.C., Senator Blackburn of Kentucky "told Crane to vigorously rub the back of his neck with a large white handkerchief when excited as that was a habit with Plumb in debate."  Twenty-four U.S. Senators were in the audience for the performance, and upon seeing that move "roared with laughter" though the general audience had no idea of the cause.

The play saw frequent productions around the United States through the 1890s and early 1900s, and was revived in Washington, D.C. as late as 1914.

T. Daniel Frawley, who was in the original cast, later obtained the rights to perform the play in the Western U.S., and enjoyed success with his own company.  Frawley later opined that everyone involved in the original production seemed to have met with success.  In addition to the crowning performances by Crane and Barrymore, for instance, he noted that Jane Stuart later "became a star" herself before marrying General Auer, a Milwaukee millionaire—one of three of the cast's females to marry millionaires.

Film

The 1915 silent film version, a five-reel production released in December of that year, was directed by Joseph A. Golden for Triumph Film Corporation.  Charles J. Ross starred as Senator Rivers.

It is not known whether the film currently survives.

Cast of 1890 play
 William H. Crane as Senator Rivers
 George F. Devere as Alexander Armstrong 
 Henry Bergman as Count Ernest von Strahl
 Harry Braham as Baron Ling Ching
 James Neill as Richard Vance
 T. Daniel Frawley as Lieut. George Schuyler
 W. Herbert as Isaiah Sharpless
 J.C. Padgett as Silas Denman
 John J. Gilmartin as Erastus
 Lizzie Hudson Collier as Mabel Denman
 Augusta Foster as Mrs. Schuyler (*Mrs. Augusta Foster, per Daniel Blum)
 Jennie Karsner as Mrs. Armstrong
 Jane Stuart as Josie Armstrong
 Georgie Drew Barrymore as Mrs. Hilary

Cast of 1915 film
 Charles J. Ross as Senator Rivers
 Joseph Burke as Senator Keene
 Ben Graham as Silas Denman
 Thomas F. Tracey as Secretary Armstrong
 Philip Hahn as Count Ernst von Strahl
 Dixie Compton as Mrs. Hilary
 Constance Mollineaux as Mabel Denman
 Gene Luneska as Mrs. Armstrong
 William Corbett

References

External links
 

1890 plays
1915 films
American silent feature films
American films based on plays
American plays adapted into films
Broadway plays
American black-and-white films
1910s American films